Operation Enduring Freedom – Horn of Africa (OEF-HOA) is a component of Operation Enduring Freedom (OEF).  The Combined Joint Task Force – Horn of Africa (CJTF-HOA) is the primary (but not sole) military component assigned to accomplish the objectives of the mission. The naval components are the multinational Combined Task Force 150 (CTF-150) and Combined Task Force 151 (CTF-151) which operates under the direction of the United States Fifth Fleet. Both of these organizations have been historically part of United States Central Command. In February 2007, United States President George W. Bush announced the establishment of the United States Africa Command which took over all of the area of operations of CJTF-HOA in October 2008.

CJTF-HOA consists of about 2,000 servicemen and women from the United States military and allied countries. The official area of responsibility comprises Sudan, Somalia, Djibouti, Ethiopia, Eritrea, Seychelles and Kenya. Outside this Combined Joint Operating Area, the CJTF-HOA has operations in Mauritius, Comoros, Liberia, Rwanda, Uganda and Tanzania. The American contribution to the operation, aside from advisers, supplies, and other forms of non-combat support, consists mainly of drone strikes targeted at Al-Shabaab. Other American combat operations include manned airstrikes, cruise missile strikes, and special forces raids.

Operations

Interception of missiles from North Korea

On 9 December 2002 the  intercepted the unflagged freighter So San several hundred miles southeast of Yemen at the request of the United States government. The frigate fired across So Sans bow after the freighter ignored hails and attempted to evade the frigate. The freighter's crew was North Korean; 23 containers containing 15 complete Scud ballistic missiles, 15 high-explosive warheads, and 23 nitric acid (used as an oxidizer for fueling Scud missiles) containers were found on board. Yemen claimed ownership of the shipment and protested the interception and U.S. officials released the vessel after receiving assurances that the missiles would not be transferred to a third party.

Anti-piracy operations

Pirates are rampant along the coast of Somalia and present a hazard to all shipping there; as such, anti-piracy operations are a routine part of Operation Enduring Freedom: Horn of Africa. This is done primarily by the Combined Task Force 150, the Combined Task Force 151, Operation Atalanta, Operation Copper and in parallel to other independent anti-piracy operations conducted off the coast of Somalia by other countries such as China, India and Russia.

2005

The United States Coast Guard cutter , working with the British aircraft carrier  and destroyer  in the Gulf of Aden, intercepted a hijacked vessel at around noon on 17 March. The interception was ordered after Commander, U.S. Naval Forces Central Command (COMUSNAVCENT) received telephone reports from the International Maritime Bureau's Piracy Reporting Center in Kuala Lumpur, Malaysia, concerning the hijacking of the Thai-flagged fishing boat Sirichai Nava 12 by three Somalis on the evening of 16 March, as well as a fax indicating that the hijackers demanded U.S. $800,000 in ransom for the vessel's crew.

Commander, Combined Task Force (CTF) 150 tasked Invincible, Nottingham and Munro to investigate the situation. A Visit, Board, Search and Seizure (VBSS) team from Munro boarded Sirichai Nava, while a boarding team from Nottingham went on to a second fishing vessel, Ekhwat Patana, which was with the Thai vessel. Munros boarding team detained the Somalis without incident.

One of the crew members of the Thai vessel had a minor flesh wound, which was treated by the Munro boarding team. The Coast Guardsmen also discovered four automatic weapons in the pilothouse, expended ammunition shells on the deck of the vessel, as well as ammunition on the detained suspects. The three suspects were transferred to Munro.

2006

The U.S. government chose not to prosecute the captured men for piracy and repatriated them over a period of several months.

2007
On 3 June 2007, a landing ship dock, engaged pirates attacking a freighter, but failed to repel them.

On 28 October 2007, the destroyer , opened fire on pirates who had captured a freighter and with other vessels blockaded a port the pirates attempted to take refuge in.

2010
On 30 March 2010, the Seychelles Coast Guard patrol vessel Topaz rescued a captured vessel, saving 27 hostages near Somalia.

On 28 November 2010 the U.S. Assistant Secretary of State Jendayi Frazer  announced that the United States has no intention of committing troops to Somalia to root out al-Qaeda.

2011

In the early morning of 22 January, 15 ROKN UDT/SEAL members boarded the 11,000-ton chemical freighter  which was taken by 13 pirates six days prior; killed 8 pirates and captured 5 without taking any casualties after three hours of intense firefighting. All 21 hostages were secured, with one hostage suffering a non-fatal gunshot wound to the abdomen.

On 12 April,  intercepted a pirate vessel, capturing 34 pirates and freeing 34 hostages. Later that day,  opened fire on another pirate vessel, killing 2 pirates.

The ship's 15 crew members claimed they were hijacked six months prior and their ship was used as a mothership for the pirates.

On 16 May,  exchanged fire with Jih Chun Tsai 68, a known pirate mothership. When a boarding team arrived, they found 3 pirates dead and captured 2 pirates.

The Danish Navy vessel, HDMS Esbern Snare exchanged fire with a hijacked boat, killing 4 pirates on 17 May. A boarding team subsequently captured 24 injured pirates and freed 16 hostages.

On 11 September, a Spanish Navy patrol boat engaged Somali pirates, freeing a French hostage after sinking the pirate skiff and capturing 7 pirates. The woman was taken hostage after pirates killed her husband and left her catamaran off the coast of Yemen.

On 11 October, Royal Marines embarked on board  freed 23 crew members of a hijacked Italian cargo ship after it had been captured by pirates five days earlier. USS DeWert was the first vessel to arrive on scene after gathering intelligence on the whereabouts of the vessel and deploying counter intelligence surveillance units in the area.

On 3 October, the Tanzania navy freed a hijacked vessel and apprehended seven pirates, They are handed over to civilian police for further action.

On 31 October, the Kenyan military announced that they had captured two pirate skiffs, sunk three, and killed 18 pirates.

2012
Acting on intelligence from other counter-piracy forces,  boarded the Indian-flagged dhow, Al Qashmi on 6 January. By the time the search team boarded, all evidence of potential piracy had been disposed of, though the crew said they were hijacked by the nine pirates on board from a different vessel. The nine suspected pirates were disarmed and given sufficient fuel and provisions to return to Somalia.

The next day, the Danish warship  intercepted an Iranian-flagged dhow after identifying it as a potential pirate mother ship. Warning shots had to be fired before a search team boarded. In addition to the crew of 5 Iranian and 9 Pakistani nationals, the team seized 25 pirates. The captured pirates were then taken aboard Absalon to determine whether they should be prosecuted.

A third pirate vessel was intercepted on 13 January. RFA Fort Victoria fired off warning shots to stop the vessel and then launched a boarding party. The pirates surrendered without incident and search uncovered several rocket-propelled grenades and automatic weapons. Royal Marines held the pirates for further investigation.

HDMS Absalon had been observing a pirate mother ship for several days when it attempted to leave the coast of Somalia on 28 February. Danish forces fired on the ship, forcing it to stop. On board were 17 pirates and 18 hostages, though two of the hostages later died from wounds sustained. NATO said that an investigation would be held regarding the hostages' deaths.

2013
On 11 October, pirates attacked Hong Kong registered tanker Island Splendor and attacked a Spanish fishing vessel three days later. The pirate skiffs were tracked by Melbournes Seahawk helicopter, a boarding team from Melbourne searched the skiffs, they successfully apprehended nine pirates and later destroyed two skiffs and their equipment.

By December 2013, the US Office of Naval Intelligence reported that only nine vessels had been attacked during the year by the pirates, with no successful hijackings. Control Risks attributed this 90% decline in pirate activity from the corresponding period in 2012 to the adoption of best management practices by vessel owners and crews, armed private security on board ships, a significant naval presence, and the development of onshore security forces.

2016

Shortly after the attacks, the USS Nitze destroyed three radar sites in Yemen in retaliation for the two separate attacks on U.S. ships in the Red Sea.

Escalating tensions in Somalia

The New York Times declared the US backing of a Somali Warlord Alliance a failed policy. A Reuters report cited that the plan had backfired and destabilized the nation.

Ethiopian invasion and occupation of Somalia

On 1 July 2006, a web-posted message purportedly written by Osama bin Laden urged Somalis to build an Islamic state in the country and warned western states that his al-Qaeda network would fight against them if they intervened there.

On 27 December 2006, The New York Times reported analysts in Nairobi, Kenya claimed U.S. surveillance aircraft were funneling information to Ethiopian forces. Major Kelley Thibode, a spokeswoman for the task force of American military personnel based in Djibouti, said she was "not at liberty to discuss" the matter. Somali Prime Minister Ali Mohammed Ghedi declared one of the key objectives of the offensive on Kismayo was the capture of three alleged al-Qaeda members, suspects wanted for the 1998 United States embassy bombings in East Africa: Fazul Abdullah Mohammed, Saleh Ali Saleh Nabhan and Abu Taha al-Sudani. At the time, the United States Fifth Fleet's maritime task force (Combined Task Force 150) based out of Bahrain, was patrolling off the Somali coast to prevent terrorists launching an "attack or to transport personnel, weapons or other material," said Commander Kevin Aandahl. The announcement did not say what particular ships comprised the cordon, but the task force includes vessels from Canada, France, Germany, Pakistan, the United Kingdom and the U.S. American ships of Combined Task Force 150 include the Arleigh Burke-class destroyer  and the Ticonderoga-class cruiser . The aim of the patrols shifted on 2 January 2007, according to diplomats, to "... stop SICC leaders or foreign militant supporters escaping".

On 2 January 2006, U.S. Marines operating out of Lamu, Kenya, were said to be assisting Kenyan forces patrolling the border with Somalia with the interception of Islamists. On 8 January it was reported that an AC-130 gunship belonging to the United States military had attacked suspected al-Qaeda operatives in southern Somalia. It was also reported that the aircraft carrier  had been moved into striking distance. The aircraft flew out of its base in Djibouti. Many bodies were spotted on the ground, but the identity of the dead or wounded was not yet established. The targeted leaders were tracked by the use of unmanned aerial vehicles (UAVs) as they headed south from Mogadishu starting on 28 December. It was reported that the leader of al-Qaeda in East Africa, Fazul Abdullah Mohammed, was killed in the attack, but later officials confirmed that he survived and also that none of the al-Qaeda operatives were killed. However, at least 10 civilians were killed. On 9 January it was reported U.S. special forces and CIA operatives were working with Ethiopian troops on the ground in operations inside Somalia from a base in Galkayo, in Puntland, and from Camp Lemonnier, Djibouti. On 12 January, a small team of U.S. forces investigated the site of the U.S. gunship attack to search for information about the identity and fate of the targeted individuals.

On 17 January 2006, the Assistant Deputy Secretary of Defense for African affairs, Theresa Whelan, clarified the airstrike conducted on 8 January was not the work of the CJTF-HOA, but of another force which she did not specify. The target of the strike was confirmed to be Aden Hashi Farah Ayro, who was believed wounded or possibly dead, while eight members of his group were killed in the attack. Likewise, many airstrikes which resulted in civilian casualties around Afmadow conducted by Ethiopian aircraft were mis-attributed to the United States. On 21 January the capture of U.S. troops was reported by the Qaadisiya.com site, as well as the death of one due to malaria, but this assertion was denied as "utterly bogus" by Michael Ranneberger, U.S. Envoy to Kenya and Somalia. On 24 January, the U.S. admitted to have made a second airstrike, but did not confirm the exact date or location of the strike. United States involvement in the conflict continued through 2008 with airstrikes targeting suspected Al Qaeda affiliated militants including a strike of dubious success conducted on 2 March 2008 where at least one U.S. naval vessel launched cruise missiles against an Al Qaeda target in a strike on the village of Dobley and a successful strike on Dhusamareb which killed several militant leaders

Alleged operations in Somaliland
On 6 May 2005, a United States Marine Corps unit reportedly landed in Somaliland, the autonomous and self-declared state in northern Somalia. The landings were purportedly conducted to carry out searches, as well as to question locals regarding the whereabouts of terrorist suspects. United States military officials denied the allegations and said operations were not being conducted in Somaliland.

Somali Civil War (2009–present)

Operations against al-Qaeda linked terrorists continued in 2009 when on 14 September several U.S. Navy helicopters launched a raid in Baraawe against Saleh Ali Saleh Nabhan, killing him as well as five other militants. Also in 2009, Operators from the SAS and the SRR were deployed to Djibouti as part of Combined Joint Task Force – Horn of Africa to conducting operations against Islamist terrorists in Somalia; carrying out missions focusing on surveillance and targeting of terrorists, alongside their US counterparts, they have also been carrying out this role in Yemen. On 5 October 2013, American commandos from DEVGRU launched an amphibious raid on the town of Baraawe engaging with al-Shabaab militants and inflicting some casualties on them before withdrawing. On 5 March 2016, U.S. airstrikes carried out by aircraft and unmanned drones killed more than 150 Al-Shabaab terrorists at a terrorist training camp called "Camp Raso", located about 120 miles north of Mogadishu as they were completing "training for a large-scale attack" according to a Pentagon spokesman. The camp had been under surveillance for some time before the strike. In the early hours of 9 March 2016, U.S. special forces and Somali national army special forces killed between 1 and 15 Al-Shabaab terrorists in a heliborne-attack on the Al-Shabaab-controlled town of Awdhegele, as well as capturing an undisclosed number of high-value Al-Shabaab figures the militants were training for a major operation against coalition forces. On 11/12 April 2016, two U.S. airstrikes on Al-Shabaab targets in the town of Kismayo killed about a dozen suspected militants who posed an "imminent threat" to American troops in the country. As of May 2016, roughly 50 U.S. special operations troops operate at undisclosed locations across southern Somalia, with their headquarters at the airport in Mogadishu; advising and assisting, Kenyan, Somali and Ugandan forces in their fight against Al-Shabaab. Also in that month, U.S. personnel helped those forces plan an operation against illegal checkpoints. On 13 May, a U.S. strike targeted nine al-Shabab militants, three of them were allegedly killed. On 1 June 2016, the Pentagon announced that it had conducted an airstrike that killed a senior Al-Shabaab leader in Somalia on 27 May. On 3 August 2016, a contingent of elite American troops acting as military advisers assisted Somali commandos in an assault on an al-Shabaab checkpoint in Saakow, as the Somali-led force approached the checkpoint the militants opened fire, a gun battle ensued that resulted in 3 militants killed. On 29 September 2016, the Military Times reported that on 26 September a bomb-manufacturing network linked al-Shabaab attacked a small team of U.S. and Somali troops, who were conducting an operation near Kismayo, with small-arms fire. A Pentagon spokesman said the U.S. military "conducted a self-defense strike to neutralize the threat and in doing so killed nine enemy fighters." Also on 28 September, near the town of Galkayo, a Somali army unit conducting counterterrorism operations nearby, when the Somali soldiers came under fire from al-Shabab militants. The Somali soldiers engaged them, then broke contact and rejoined with their nearby American advisers and soon afterwards the militants "began to maneuver in an offensive manner" so the U.S. conducted a self-defense airstrike, killing 4 militants.

Drone attacks

 On 25 June 2011, U.S. Predator drones attacked a Shabaab training camp south of Kismayo. Ibrahim al-Afghani, a senior al Shabaab leader was rumored to be killed in the strike.
 On 6 September 2011, a U.S. drone struck a large Al-Shabaab base, killing 35 militants.
 A drone strike on 17 September killed 17 militants.
 A U.S. drone strike occurred near Mogadishu on 21 January 2012, killing British al-Qaeda operative Bilal el-Berjawi.
 4 Al-Shabaab fighters, including a white Kenyan and a Moroccan jihadist named Abu Ibrahim, were killed in a drone strike in the K60 area (60 miles south of Mogadishu) of the Lower Shabelle region in southern Somalia late on 24 February 2012.

United States military fatalities
27 U.S. servicemen have been killed in non-hostile incidents in Djibouti since the start of operations in the Horn of Africa.

Four U.S. soldiers were killed in accidents in Kenya.

Two U.S. soldiers were killed in a vehicle accident in Ethiopia.

Two U.S. servicemen were killed in the Republic of Seychelles and in the Gulf of Oman, respectively.

See also
 Operation Atalanta
 Manhunt (military)
 Baraawe raid

References

External links
 Operation Enduring Freedom – Horn of Africa / Djibouti Global Security.
 Djibouti Base Global Security.
 Combined Joint Task Force – Horn of Africa (CJTF-HOA) Global Security.
 Combined Joint Task Force Horn of Africa Official U.S. Military web site
 USCGC Munro and UK Navy US And UK Navies Resolve Hi-Jacking

Somali Civil War
Piracy in Somalia
Counterterrorism in the United States
Enduring Freedom – Horn of Africa
Enduring Freedom – Horn of Africa
War on terror
Horn of Africa
United States Marine Corps in the 21st century
Anti-piracy
Enduring Freedom – Horn of Africa
Enduring Freedom – Horn of Africa
Enduring Freedom – Horn of Africa
Enduring Freedom – Horn of Africa